Brasiliomyces is a genus of fungi in the family Erysiphaceae. The widely distributed genus contains seven species.

Species
 Brasiliomyces cyclobalanopsidis
 Brasiliomyces entadae
 Brasiliomyces kumaonensis
 Brasiliomyces malachrae
 Brasiliomyces malvastri
 Brasiliomyces setosus
 Brasiliomyces trina

References

Erysiphales
Fungal plant pathogens and diseases